George Ledin, Jr. (born January 28, 1946) is an American computer scientist and professor of computer science at Sonoma State University. Ledin's teaching of computer security at Sonoma State has been controversial for its inclusion of material on how to write malware. Ledin is a strong critic of the antivirus software industry, whose products he considers almost useless. Ledin also helped found the computer science program at the University of San Francisco, and published several books on computing in the 1970s and 1980s.

Education and career
Ledin is a 1967 graduate of the University of California, Berkeley.

He started teaching computer science at the University of San Francisco in 1965, as the second computer scientist at the university, five years before the university's computer science department itself was founded. In 1970, he served as vice-president of The Fibonacci Association, and host of its annual meeting. In 1973, as a researcher in the Institute of Chemical Biology and instructor in computer science at the university, he was the chair of the first national conference on ALGOL, By 1980 he was head of the computer science department at the university.

He earned a Juris Doctor at the University of San Francisco in 1982, and moved to the Sonoma State faculty in 1984.

Books
Ledin is author or co-author of books including:
Programming the IBM 1130 (with Robert K. Louden, 2nd ed., Prentice-Hall, 1972)
A Structured Approach to General BASIC (Boyd & Fraser, 1978)
The Programmer's Book of Rules (Lifetime Learning / Wiley, 1979)
Understanding Pascal (Alfred Publishing, 1981)
Pascal (Mayfield Publishing, 1982)
The Personal Computer Glossary (Alfred Publishing, 1983)
The COBOL Programmer's Book of Rules (with Victor Ledin and Michael D. Kudlick, Lifetime Learning / Wiley, 1983).

Personal life
Ledin was born in Austria. He and his co-author Victor Ledin are brothers, both sons of Georgii Grigorievich Ledin (1921–2019), an immigrant from the Georgian city of Sukhumi.

References

External links
 Dr. Ledin page @ Sonoma State University.
 "Not teaching malware is harmful" @ Sonoma State University.

Living people
American computer scientists
University of California, Berkeley alumni
University of San Francisco alumni
Sonoma State University faculty
Computer security specialists
20th-century American scientists
21st-century American scientists
1946 births